The Utz Arena (formerly the Toyota Arena) is a 5,500-seat multi-purpose arena in York, Pennsylvania, United States; located at the York Expo Center, which is on the York Fairgrounds. The state-of-the-art arena was built in 2003 and hosts local sporting events, auctions, conferences, and concerts.  Toyota owned the naming rights to the arena from 2003 to 2013, when it was replaced by Utz.

References

External links
 

Indoor arenas in Pennsylvania
Sports venues in Pennsylvania
Buildings and structures in York, Pennsylvania
Tourist attractions in York County, Pennsylvania
Convention centers in Pennsylvania
Sports in York, Pennsylvania